"Here on My Own (Lighter Shade Of Blue)" is the second single by Sweetbox from the album Jade with Jade Villalon as a frontwoman. 
On the album the song is titled "Lighter Shade of Blue". The song peaked at 90 on the German singles chart. It spent 1 week at this position and 4 weeks on the chart.

An acoustic version and the music video of the song can be found on the album Jade (Silver Edition). A remix of the song can be found on the album Best of 12" Collection.

The music video for the song was directed by Oliver Sommer.

Track listing

Positions

References

Sweetbox songs
2003 singles
2001 songs
Songs written by Jade Villalon
Warner Music Group singles
Music videos directed by Oliver Sommer